Duncan McRae (May 30, 1823 - March 12, 1879) was an Ontario businessman, farmer and political figure. He represented Victoria North in the Legislative Assembly of Ontario as a Conservative member from 1871 to 1879.

He was born in Ross-shire, Scotland and came to Glengarry County in Upper Canada while still young. He moved to Victoria County around 1850. He was involved in the construction of the Toronto and Nipissing Railway as a contractor. He served as warden of Victoria County. He was elected in 1871 and defeated in 1875 but was elected in a subsequent by-election after the sitting member was unseated after an appeal. He died in office in March 1879 of cancer.

References

External links 

The Canadian parliamentary companion and annual register, 1879, CH Mackintosh

1823 births
1879 deaths
Immigrants to Upper Canada
People from Kawartha Lakes
People from Ross and Cromarty
Progressive Conservative Party of Ontario MPPs
Scottish emigrants to pre-Confederation Ontario